Radio-i (JOGW-FM) was a multilingual commercial radio station based in central Japan in Nagoya, Aichi Prefecture, owned by the Kowa Company.

Nagoya University cited this station along with rival ZIP-FM (JFL, 77.8 MHz) as sources  of multilingual information during emergencies. In times of disaster the station could broadcast vital information to listeners in Chinese, English, Simple Japanese, Korean, Portuguese, Spanish and Tagalog.

The station broadcast on three frequencies, 79.5 FM in Nagoya and across Aichi Prefecture, 79.9 FM in Hamamatsu and southern Shizuoka Prefecture, and on 83.0 FM in the southern districts of Aichi Prefecture from Toyohashi. Playing a mixture of Top 40 and Album-oriented rock formats, Radio-i featured a team of mostly bilingual radio DJs handling the main programs.

Citing falling advertising revenue and ratings in the Aichi region, Radio-i ceased broadcasting operations on September 30, 2010 after 10 years and 5 months on the air. After a 17-hour live broadcast featuring current and past DJs, the last song played was ABBA - "Thank You For the Music", and broadcasting ceased at midnight after station ID. With the loss of carrier at 12:02 am, Radio-i became the first civilian radio station in the history of Japanese peacetime broadcasting to completely cease operations.

At the time the station closed, the DJ lineup featured Cocoro in the mornings, afternoons had Australian DJ Chris Glenn followed by Eri Sano, with evenings DJ'd by Yuko Takeda. Other main DJs included Hana Shintani and Sudo Ryumi.  The Sorensen Media Group in Guam provided some of the original radio programming for both Radio-i Nagoya and InterFM Tokyo.

References

External links
 Radio-i website
 Kowa Group

Defunct radio stations in Japan
Mass media in Nagoya
Radio stations established in 2000
Radio stations disestablished in 2010
Japanese companies established in 2000
Japanese companies disestablished in 2010